Cryptandra intermedia is a flowering plant in the family Rhamnaceae and is endemic to the southwest of Western Australia. It is a small shrub, usually with spiny branchlets, elliptic to linear leaves and spike-like clusters of white, tube-shaped flowers.

Description
The upper surface of the leaves is glabrous, the edges turned down or rolled under, often concealing the densely hairy lower surface. The flowers are borne in head-like clusters of 2 to 10, surrounded by about 8 broadly egg-shaped to oblong bracts.

Taxonomy and naming
This cryptandra was first formally described in 1995 by Barbara Lynette Rye who gave it the name Cryptandra arbutiflora var. intermedia in the journal Nuytsia from specimens collected near the Jurien Bay turnoff from the Brand Highway in 1992. In 2007, Rye raised the variety to species status as Cryptandra intermedia in a later edition of Nuytsia. The specific epithet (intermedia ) means "coming between", referring to the floral morphology of this species in relation to others in the genus.

Distribution
Cryptandra intermedia grows in rocky and undulating places, on slopes and hilltops, in winter-wet sites and along creeks, mostly between Cockleshell Gully, Mount Peron, Gingin and Moora in the Avon Wheatbelt, Esperance Plains, Geraldton Sandplains, Jarrah Forest and Swan Coastal Plain bioregions of south-western Western Australia.

Conservation status
Cryptandra intermedia is listed as "not threatened" by the Western Australian Government Department of Biodiversity, Conservation and Attractions.

References

intermedia
Rosales of Australia
Flora of Western Australia
Plants described in 2007
Taxa named by Barbara Lynette Rye